Častkov is a village and municipality in Senica District in the Trnava Region of western Slovakia.

History 
In historical records the village was first mentioned in 1394.

Geography 
The municipality lies at an altitude of 280 metres and covers an area of 13.182 km². It has a population of about 610 people.

Genealogical resources

The records for genealogical research are available at the state archive "Statny Archiv in Bratislava, Slovakia"

 Roman Catholic church records (births/marriages/deaths): 1697-1910 (parish B)
 Lutheran church records (births/marriages/deaths): 1733-1902 (parish A)

See also
 List of municipalities and towns in Slovakia

References

External links 

 http://www.statistics.sk/mosmis/eng/run.html
Surnames of living people in Castkov

Villages and municipalities in Senica District